William Byrd was an African-American man who was lynched in Brentwood, Wayne County, Georgia by a mob on May 28, 1922. According to the United States Senate Committee on the Judiciary it was the 31st of 61 lynchings during 1922 in the United States.

Background
A number of workers were employed to work on the farm of B.W. Moody, a well-off farmer who lived near Byrd. One of those who agreed to work at Moody's farm was Byrd's wife. She wanted to ride in the front of the truck to get to Moody's farm but Moody wouldn't let her. She complained of the slight to her husband, William Byrd.  He went to confront Moody and the argument got out of control with Byrd allegedly shooting and killing Moody and seriously wounded Browning Weaver and Carlos Moody in the arm.

Lynching

Byrd fled into the wilderness but hounds were procured from the sheriff of Wayne county at Jesup, Georgia, and used to track him down. He was surrounded and shot multiple times. The perpetrators then burned the body.

See also
Alfred Williams was lynched on March 12, 1922, in Harlem, Georgia, for allegedly shooting and wounding L.O. Anderson, a white farmer. Anderson recovered from his wounds.

Bibliography 
Notes

References

1922 riots
1922 in Georgia (U.S. state)
African-American history of Georgia (U.S. state)
Deaths by person in Georgia (U.S. state)
December 1922 events
Lynching deaths in Georgia (U.S. state)
Protest-related deaths
Racially motivated violence against African Americans
Riots and civil disorder in Georgia (U.S. state)
White American riots in the United States
Wayne County, Georgia